The Producers Guild Film Awards, previously known as the Apsara Awards, is an award event hosted by the Producers Guild of India to recognize excellence in Hindi film and television. Originated by filmmaker and scholar Amit Khanna in 2004, the Guild Awards were one of the major award events from 2004 till 2016, when the last awards ceremony happened. The 22-karat gold statuette was sculpted and designed by the jewellery brand Tanishq and was "inspired by the rich heritage of one of India's most treasured possessions – the Ajanta and Ellora Caves." Nominations for the awards come from selected members of the guild, with the full membership (around 160) available to vote for the winners. The ballots cast by the guild members are then taken to a common venue for the final counting.

History
The first Star Guild Awards ceremony was held on 28 May 2004 in Mumbai, India to honor outstanding film and television achievements of the 2003–04 film and television season. While the award ceremonies are usually held at the beginning of the subsequent year, the fourth edition of the award ceremony (2008–09) was postponed to the end of the year as a sign of respect to the victims of the 2008 Mumbai attacks.

List of nominees and winners
For the year 2003, held in 2004 – Nominees & Winners
For the year 2004, held in 2005 – Not held
For the year 2005, held in 2006 – Nominees & Winners
For the year 2006, held in 2007 – Not held
For the year 2007, held in 2008 – Nominees & Winners
For the year 2008, held in 2009 – Nominees & Winners
For the year 2009, held in 2010 – Nominees & Winners
For the year 2010, held in 2011 – Nominees & Winners
For the year 2011, held in 2012 – Nominees & Winners
For the year 2012, held in 2013 – Nominees & Winners
For the year 2013, held in 2014 – Nominees & Winners
For the year 2014, held in 2015 – Nominees & Winners
For the year 2015, held in 2016 – Nominees & Winners

Hosts

Film awards

Merit awards
Best Film
Best Director
Best Actor in a Leading Role
Best Actress in a Leading Role
Best Actor in a Supporting Role
Best Actress in a Supporting Role
Best Actor in a Negative Role
Best Actor in a Comic Role
Best Male Debut
Best Female Debut
Best Debut Director
Music Director
Best Lyricist
Best Male Playback Singer
Best Female Playback Singer

Technical awards

Best Story

Best Screenplay

Best Dialogues

Best Editing

Best Cinematographer

Best Costume Design

Best Art Direction

Best Choreography

Best Special Effects

Best Sound Recording

Special awards

Lifetime Achievement

Entertainer of the Year

Jodi of the Year
Jodi of the Year: Salman Khan & Govinda (2008)
Style Icon / Diva of the Year: Hrithik Roshan & Katrina Kaif (2008)
Heartthrob of the Year: Shahid Kapoor & Deepika Padukone (2010)
During the sixth edition of the award ceremony, four separate awards were also given to honour the films and performances of December 2009; this included: Vidhu Vinod Chopra winning the Best Film for 3 Idiots, Rajkumar Hirani for his direction of 3 Idiots, as well as Amitabh Bachchan and Vidya Balan for their performances in Paa.
Cinematic Excellence: Sanjay Leela Bhansali, Hrithik Roshan and Aishwarya Rai (2011)
Guild Hall of Fame: Aashiqui 2, Bhaag Milkha Bhaag, Chennai Express, Dhoom 3, Goliyon Ki Raasleela Ram-Leela, Grand Masti, Krrish 3, Race 2 & Yeh Jawaani Hai Deewani (2014)

Television

Merit awards

Best Drama Series – Fiction

Best Director – Fiction

Best Actor in a Drama Series
Best Actress in a Drama Series

Best Ongoing Drama Series

Best Non-Fiction Series

Best Comedy Series

Best Mythological Series

Best Ensemble Cast

Best Writer

Special awards
Best Production House: Balaji Telefilms (2003, 2005)
Outstanding Contribution to Indian Television: Subhash Chandra (Zee Network) (2003)
Outstanding Debut: Mona Singh for (Jassi Jaissi Koi Nahin) (2003)
Best Marketing of Entertainment Product: Sony Entertainment Television (Jassi Jaissi Koi Nahin) (2003)
Cinematic Excellence in Television: Amitabh Bachchan (2012)

See also 

 List of Asian television awards

References

External links 
Official Site

 
Awards established in 2004
Indian television awards
Bollywood film awards
2004 establishments in Maharashtra
2016 disestablishments in India